Orunia-Św. Wojciech-Lipce is one of the quarters of the city of Gdańsk, Poland.

History 
Ohra (Orunia) was an estate of Arthur Schopenhauer's family, his grandfather, Andreas Schopenhauer, died here in 1794.

Demographics

External links

Map of Orunia-Św. Wojciech-Lipce

References 

Districts of Gdańsk